Matti Pitkänen (born 20 December 1948, in Ikaalinen) is a Finnish former cross-country skier who competed in the late 1970s and early 1980s. He won two medals in the 4 × 10 km relay at the Winter Olympics with a gold in 1976 and a bronze in 1980. He also finished sixth in the 30 km at the 1980 Winter Olympics.

Pitkänen also won a silver medal in the 4 × 10 km relay at the 1978 FIS Nordic World Ski Championships in Lahti. He also finished fourth in the 15 km, 30 km, and 50 km events at those same games.

Pitkänen won the 50 km event at the Holmenkollen ski festival in 1978.

Cross-country skiing results
All results are sourced from the International Ski Federation (FIS).

Olympic Games
 2 medals – 1 gold, 1 bronze)

World Championships
 1 medal – (1 silver)

World Cup

Season standings

References

External links
 
 - click Vinnere for downloadable pdf file 
 

1951 births
Living people
People from Ikaalinen
Cross-country skiers at the 1976 Winter Olympics
Cross-country skiers at the 1980 Winter Olympics
Finnish male cross-country skiers
Holmenkollen Ski Festival winners
Olympic medalists in cross-country skiing
FIS Nordic World Ski Championships medalists in cross-country skiing
Medalists at the 1976 Winter Olympics
Medalists at the 1980 Winter Olympics
Olympic gold medalists for Finland
Olympic bronze medalists for Finland
Olympic cross-country skiers of Finland
Sportspeople from Pirkanmaa
20th-century Finnish people